"Boomerang" is a song recorded by German recording artist Blümchen (a.k.a. Jasmin Wagner). It is one of her most well-known songs and was released in June 1996 as the third single from her debut album, Herzfrequenz/Heartbeat (1996). Produced by producers/songwriters Arn Schlürmann and Stani Djukanovic, it was also co-written by Schlürmann with Alfred von Meysenbug and Lukas Hilbert. During its first chart run, it peaked at number eleven in Germany, number nine in Switzerland, number ten in Austria and number sixteen in Norway (April 1997). On the Eurochart Hot 100, the single reached number 33 in August 1996. It is sung in German, and its accompanying music video, directed by Oliver Sommer, features Blümchen performing while she rolls around on roller skates. 

In 2010, "Boomerang" returned to the German charts for three weeks, peaking at number two on the download chart, and number seven on the single chart. On the Europe Top 200 chart, it reached number 89.

Track listing
 12" single, Germany (1996)
"Boomerang" (Langer Boooomerang Mix) – 5:25
"Boomerang" (Album Mix) – 5:06
"Boomerang" (In Der Luft Mix) – 3:51

 CD single, Germany (2010)
"Boomerang" – 3:51
"Herz An Herz" – 3:46

 CD maxi, Germany, Austria & Switzerland (1996)
"Boomerang" (Boomerang In Der Luft Mix) – 3:51
"Boomerang" (Langer Boooomerang Mix) – 5:25
"Boomerang" (Boomerang Album Mix) – 5:06

Charts

Weekly charts

Year-end charts

References

 

1996 singles
2010 singles
1996 songs
Eurodance songs
German dance songs
Music videos directed by Oliver Sommer
Songs written by Lukas Loules